Red Box is the name of the junction of the Angeles Crest Highway, the Mt. Wilson-Red Box Road, and the  Rincon - Red Box Road. It is located at the 1,422 meter (4,666') saddle between Mount Lawlor and San Gabriel Peak.  The saddle separates the upper Arroyo Seco drainage from the West Fork of the San Gabriel River.

References 

Unincorporated communities in Los Angeles County, California
San Gabriel Mountains
Unincorporated communities in California